The Linotype machine is a "line casting" machine used in printing; manufactured and sold by the former Mergenthaler Linotype Company and related  It was a hot metal typesetting system that cast lines of metal type for individual uses. Linotype became one of the mainstay methods to set type, especially small-size body text, for newspapers, magazines, and posters from the late 19th century to the 1970s and 1980s, when it was largely replaced by phototypesetting and digital typesetting. The name of the machine comes from the fact that it produces an entire line of metal type at once, hence a line-o'-type. It was a significant improvement over the previous industry standard of manual, letter-by-letter typesetting using a composing stick and shallow subdivided trays, called "cases".

The Linotype machine operator enters text on a 90-character keyboard. The machine assembles matrices, which are molds for the letter forms, in a line. The assembled line is then cast as a single piece, called a slug, from molten type metal in a process known as hot metal typesetting. The matrices are then returned to the type magazine, to be reused continuously. This allows much faster typesetting and composition than original hand composition in which operators place down one pre-cast sort (metal letter, punctuation mark or space) at a time.

The machine revolutionized typesetting and with it especially newspaper publishing, making it possible for a relatively small number of operators to set type for many pages daily. Ottmar Mergenthaler invented the Linotype in 1884 alongside James Ogilvie Clephane, who provided the financial backing for commercialization.

History 

In 1876, a German clock maker, Ottmar Mergenthaler, who had emigrated to the United States in 1872, was approached by James O. Clephane and his associate Charles T. Moore, who sought a quicker way of publishing legal briefs. By 1884, he conceived the idea of assembling metallic letter molds, called matrices, and casting molten metal into them, all within a single machine. His first attempt proved the idea feasible and a new company was formed. Improving his invention, Mergenthaler further developed his idea of an independent matrix machine. In July, 1886, the first commercially used Linotype was installed in the printing office of the New York Tribune. Here, it was immediately used on the daily paper and a large book. The book, the first ever composed with the new Linotype method, was titled The Tribune Book of Open-Air Sports.

Initially, the Mergenthaler Linotype Company was the only company (led by Ottmar Mergenthaler and eventually also James O. Clephane) producing linecasting machines, but in time, other companies would begin manufacturing similar machines. The Intertype Company produced the Intertype, a machine closely resembling the Linotype, using the same matrices as the Linotype, which started production around 1914. Where Mergenthaler prided themselves on intricately formed cast-iron parts on their machine, Intertype machined many of their similar parts from steel and aluminum.

Major newspaper publishers retired Linotype and similar "hot metal" typesetting machines during the 1970s and 1980s, replacing them with phototypesetting equipment and later computerized typesetting and page composition systems. , the last-known newspaper still using Linotype in the United States is The Saguache Crescent.  is the last one in Western Europe.

Overview 

The linotype machine consists of four major sections:

 Magazine
 Keyboard
 Casting mechanism
 Distribution mechanism

The operator interacts with the machine via the keyboard, composing lines of text. The other sections are automatic; they start as soon as a line is completely composed.

Some Linotype machines included a paper tape reader. This also allowed the text to be typeset to be supplied over a telegraph line (TeleTypeSetter). Perforator operators produced paper tape text at a much higher speed which then was cast by more productive tape-controlled Linotype machines.

Design

Matrices 

Each matrix contains the letter form for a single character of a font of type; i.e., a particular type face in a particular size. The letter forms are engraved into one side of the matrix. For sizes up to 14 points, and in some matrices of size 16 to 24 points, the matrix has two letter forms on it, the normal and auxiliary positions. The normal position has the upright (Roman) form of a given character, and on the auxiliary, the slanted (Italic) form of that character will be used, but this can also be the boldface form or even a different font entirely. The machine operator can select which of the two faces will be cast by operating the auxiliary rail of the assembler, or, when setting entire lines of italics, by using the flap, which is a piece that can be turned under a portion of the first elevator column. This is the origin of the old typesetting terms upper rail for italic and lower rail for Roman characters. These terms have persisted in phototypesetting technology even though the mechanics of the auxiliary rail do not exist there. The character on a Linotype matrix, when viewed, is not inverted as a letter for conventional movable type would be, and the letter is incised below the surface rather than raised above it. This is because the matrix is not used directly to print onto the paper—rather, it is used as part of a mold from which a metal slug will be cast. The slug has its features reversed: therefore, the matrix does not.

Magazine section 

The magazine section is the part of the machine where the matrices are held when not in use, and released as the operator touches keys on the keyboard. The magazine is a flat box with vertical separators that form "channels", one channel for each character in the font. Most main magazines have 90 channels, but those for larger fonts carried only 72 or even 55 channels. The auxiliary magazines used on some machines typically contained 34 channels or, for a magazine carrying larger fonts, 28 channels.

The magazine holds a particular font of type; i.e., a particular type design in a particular size. If a different size or style was needed, the operator would switch to a different magazine. Many models of the Linotype machine could keep several magazines (as many as four) available at a time. In some of these, the operator could shift to a different magazine by raising or lowering the stack of magazines with a crank. Such machines would not allow mixing fonts within a single line. Others, such as the Models 25 and 26 allowed arbitrary mixing of text from two magazines within the same line, and the Model 9 extended this capability to mixing from up to four magazines within a single line.

Escapement 
In a linotype machine, the term escapements refers to the mechanisms at the bottom of the magazine that release matrices one at a time as keys are pressed on the keyboard. There is an escapement for each channel in the magazine.

Maintenance and lubrication 

To keep the matrices circulating smoothly throughout the machine, it is necessary that oil not be allowed anywhere near the matrix path. Oil in the matrix's path (due to careless maintenance or over-lubrication of nearby parts) can combine with dust, forming a gummy substance that is eventually deposited in the magazine by the matrices. This can cause the matrix to be released from the magazine slower than its usual speed, and usually results in a letter or two arriving out of sequence in the assembler—a "matrix transposition". When these machines were in heavy use, it was not uncommon for an operator to set type at the rate of over 4,000 ems per hour. The fastest operators could exceed 10,000 ems per hour (approximately 10 to 30 words per minute in today's units), hence careful lubrication and regular cleaning were essential to keep these machines operating at full potential.

Keyboard and composing section 

In the composing section, the operator enters the text for a line on the keyboard. Each keystroke releases a matrix from the magazine mounted above the keyboard. The matrix travels through channels to the assembler where the matrices are lined up side by side in the order they were released.

When a space is needed, the operator touches the spaceband lever just to the left of the keyboard. This releases a spaceband from the spaceband box. Spacebands are stored separately from the matrices because they are too big to fit in the magazine.

Once enough text has been entered for the line, the operator depresses the casting lever mounted on the front right corner of the keyboard. This lifts the completed line in the assembler up between two fingers in the "delivery channel", simultaneously tripping the catch holding it in position. The spring-operated delivery channel then transports the line into the casting section of the machine, and engages the clutch that drives the casting section and the subsequent transfer into the distribution section. The operator is now finished with the line; the remaining processing is automatic. While the line is being cast, the operator can continue entering text for the next line.

Keyboard 

The keyboard has 90 keys. The usual arrangement is that black keys on the left were for small letters, white keys on the right were for capital letters, and blue keys in the center for numbers, punctuation marks, spaces, small caps and other items. There is no shift key of the kind found on typewriters.

The arrangement of letters corresponds roughly to letter frequency, with the most frequently used letters on the left. The first two columns of keys are: e, t, a, o, i, n; and s, h, r, d, l, u. A Linotype operator would often deal with a typing error by running the fingers down these two rows, thus filling out the line with the nonsense words etaoin shrdlu. This is known as a "run down". It is often quicker to cast a bad slug than to hand-correct the line within the assembler. The slug with the run down is removed once it has been cast, or by the proofreader.

The linotype keyboard has the same alphabet arrangement given twice, once for lower-case letters, the keys in black, on the left side of the keyboard, and once for upper-case letters, the keys in white, located on the right side of the keyboard. The blue keys in the middle are punctuation, digits, small capital letters and fixed-width spaces. In proper keyboard operation, an experienced operator's left hand operates only the spaceband key and the left column of keys. The operator's right hand strokes the remaining keys on the entire keyboard.

The keys of the keyboard are connected by vertical pushrods to the escapements. When a key is pressed, the corresponding escapement is actuated, which releases a matrix from the magazine. With one exception, each key corresponds directly to a channel in the standard (90 channel) magazine. The one exception is the lower-case letter e: that letter is used so often that the 90 channel magazine actually has 91 channels, with two channels (the leftmost two) both used for the letter e. Similarly, the 72 channel magazine actually has 73 channels, with the leftmost two being used for lower-case e. Alternate lines release matrices alternately from the two e channels in the magazine.

On machines that support multiple magazines, there is a shifting mechanism that controls which magazine is currently connected to the keyboard. In most machines, this is done by raising or lowering the stack of magazines.

Spaceband box 

In justified text, the spaces are not fixed width; they expand to make all lines equal in width. In linotype machines this is done by spacebands. A spaceband consists of two wedges, one similar in size and shape to a type matrix, one with a long tail. The wide part of the wedge is at the bottom of the tail, so pushing the tail up expands the spaceband.

Due to their size, spacebands are not held in the magazine, but in a spaceband box and released one at a time by pressing the spaceband lever at the left edge of the keyboard.

Assembler 
As the matrices are released from the magazine, they are guided by way of partitions in the assembler front down to a rapidly moving belt, which brings the matrices into the assembler. The spaceband box is positioned above the assembler, the bands dropping almost directly into the assembler. At the end of the moving belt is a rapidly rotating 'star wheel' that gives each incoming matrix or spaceband a small kick to make room for the next one (the star wheel is made of a phenolic-type material to minimize wear of the matrices and bands). 

The assembler itself is a rail that holds the matrices and spacebands, with a jaw on the left end set to the desired line width. When the operator judges that the line is close enough to full (some machines have an attached bell to accomplish the same thing), he raises the casting lever on the bottom of the keyboard to send the line to the casting section of the linotype machine. The remaining processing for that line is automatic; as soon as the finished line has been transferred to the casting section, the operator can begin composing the next line of text.

Casting section 
The casting section of the machine operated intermittently when triggered by the operator at the completion of a line.   The full casting cycle time was less than nine seconds.  Motive power for the casting section came from a clutch-operated drive running large cams (the keyboard and distributor sections ran all the time, since distribution may take much longer; however, the front part of the distributor completed its job before the next line of matrices was distributed). The construction of the machine was such that both the return of the former line to the magazine and the composition of the next line could occur while the current line was being cast, enabling very high productivity.

Older machines typically had a  850- or 1140-revolution-per-minute motor geared to the main clutch wheel, the inner shaft engaging this wheel while the casting cycle was in operation.  An external leather belt on this wheel ran a second jackshaft, which powered the distributor and keyboard matrix conveyor and escapements through additional belting off this shaft.  Gas fired pots, such as in the illustration below, were most common in the earlier years, with the pot being thermostatically controlled (high flame when under temperature and low flame when up to temperature), and then a second smaller burner for the mouth and throat heating, with the more modern installations running on 1500 watt electric pots with an initially rheostat controlled mouth and throat heaters (several hundred watts on the electric models).  The temperature was precisely adjusted to keep the lead and tin type metal liquified just prior to being cast.  Newer machines, and the larger machines above 36 EM Matrix size typically used the more standardized  motor after v-belts came into common use in the 1930s.  The large machines also had the so-called 'double pot', with either larger gas burners, or else 2250-watt pot heaters and larger mouth and throat heaters.  The most modern Linotypes had the mouth and throat heaters thermostatically controlled, an improvement over the manual rheostat adjustment, or gas flame adjustment.
The Linotype company supplied kerosene heaters and line-shaft operated machines for use in locales without electricity.

The casting section receives completed lines from the assembler, and uses these to cast the type slugs that are the product of the linotype machine. The casting section is automatic: once it is activated by the operator sending a completed line by raising the casting lever, a series of cams and levers move the matrices through the casting section and control the sequence of steps that produce the slug.

The casting material is an alloy of lead (85%), antimony (11%), and tin (4%), and produces a one-piece casting slug capable of 300,000 impressions before the casting begins to develop deformities and imperfections, and the type must be cast again.

The continuous heating of the molten alloy causes the tin and antimony in the mixture to rise to the top and oxidize along with other impurities into a substance called "dross" which must be skimmed off. Excessive dross formation leads to the alloy softening as the proportion of lead increases. The mixture must then be assayed and tin and antimony added back (in the form of a specially proportioned alloy) to restore the original strength and properties of the alloy.

Justification 

From the assembler, the assembled line moves via the first elevator to the justification vise. The vise has two jaws (1 and 2 in the illustration) which are set to the desired line width. The spacebands are now expanded to justify the line. When the line is justified, the matrices fit tightly between the vise jaws, forming a tight seal that will prevent the molten type metal from escaping when the line is cast.

Justification is done by a spring-loaded ram (5) which raises the tails of the spacebands, unless the machine was equipped with a Star Parts automatic hydraulic quadding attachment or Linotype hydraquadder.

If the operator did not assemble enough characters, the line will not justify correctly: even with the spacebands expanded all the way, the matrices are not tight. A safety mechanism in the justification vise detects this and blocks the casting operation. Without such a mechanism, the result would be a squirt of molten type metal spraying out through the gaps between the matrices, creating a time-consuming mess and a possible hazard to the operator. If a squirt did occur, it was generally up to the operator to grab the hell bucket and catch the flowing lead. It was so called because the bucket would often "go to hell", or melt, while holding the molten lead that was still extremely hot. Also, in conjunction with possible hazards facing an operator, toxic lead fumes were possible, as they were the result of melting the lead ingots for casting.

Mold disk and crucible 
The justification vise holds the assembled line against the face of the mold disk. The mold disk has rectangular openings which correspond to the line length and point thickness of the slugs (cast lines) to be made. Mold liners fit into these openings for specific slug dimensions. The maximum line length of the typical linecaster is 30 picas. A less common variant was fitted with 42 pica molds, though these are now rare to non-existent.

Directly behind the mold disk is the crucible, which contains molten type metal at an optimal 535°F. At the moment before casting, the mold disk moves forward on its slide. Studs in the mold disc engage with blocks on the vise so that the mold disc seats gently, yet tightly and squarely against the line of matrices held in the first elevator jaws and between the vise jaws. The vise jaws compress the line of matrices so molten metal is prevented from squeezing between the mats on cast. The crucible tilts forward, forcing the mouthpiece tightly against the back of the mold. The plunger in the well of the crucible quickly descends, forcing the molten metal up the crucible throat and injecting it into the mold cavity through the array of orifices in the mouthpiece. The jets of molten metal first contact against the casting face of the matrices, and then fills the mold cavity to provide a solid slug body. These have character shapes punched into them, so the result is a cast slug with the character shapes of the line on its top face. The mold disk is sometimes water-cooled, and often air-cooled with a blower, to carry away the heat of the molten type metal and allow the cast slugs to solidify quickly.

When casting is complete, the plunger is drawn upward, pulling the metal back down the throat from the mouthpiece. The pot pulls backward away from the mold. The mold disk retracts from the vise studs which held it in perfect relation to the mold, thus breaking the slug away from the matrices. The mold disc then rotates counter-clockwise. In its travel, the slug base is trimmed by the back knife for height to paper (.918") and then returns to its neutral position in front of the ejector blades and aligned with the knife block assembly a pair of honed knives with a fixed knife, and a knife which is set to the point thickness of the mold liners being cast with. The knives are set to dead parallel. The fixed knife on the left bears against the smooth side of the slug (the mold body face of the slug) as it brushes next to it, and the right knife trims the ribs on the slug (the mold cap face of the slug). The disk stops when the mold is vertical, on the right, directly in front of the ejector.

The ejector is a stacked series of narrow blades that push the completed slug from the mold aperture in the mold disk. The blades are narrow enough to pass through a mold set to 6-points in thickness with .004" clearance between the fixed mold face and the left side of the blades. The blades are each 2 picas in width and the number of blades engaged on ejection are set based on the line length being cast. All blades are engaged for a 30 pica slug, fewer are engaged as the measure of the slug body is narrowed by the use of progressively longer mold liners. This prevents the ejector blades from striking the back of a mold liner on narrow slugs. As the slug is pushed from the mold, the slug passes a set of knife edges in the knife block, which trims off any small irregularities in the casting and produces a slug of exactly the desired point thickness. From there, the slug drops into the galley tray which holds the lines in the order in which they were cast.

Distribution mechanism 

The most significant innovation in the linotype machine was that it automated the distribution step; i.e., returning the matrices and space bands back to the correct place in their respective magazines. This is done by the distributor.

After casting is completed, the matrices are pushed to the second elevator which raises them to the distributor at the top of the magazine. The space bands are separated out at this point and are returned to the spaceband box.

The matrices have a pattern of teeth at the top, by which they hang from the distributor bar. Some of the teeth are cut away; which pattern of teeth is cut away depends on the character on the matrix; i.e., which channel in the magazine it belongs in. Similarly, teeth are cut away along portions of the distributor bar. The bar on the elevator has all teeth, so it will hold any matrix (but not the space bands, which have no teeth at all).

Distributor bar and matrix teeth coding 

As the matrices are carried along the distributor bar by the distributor screws, they will hang on only so long as there are teeth to hold them. As soon as the matrix reaches the point where each of its teeth corresponds to a cut-away tooth on the distributor bar, it is no longer supported and will drop into the matrix channel below that point.

The pattern of teeth is a 7-bit binary code, with the innermost pair of teeth at the bottom of the notch being the most significant bit. The codes count up from the left side of the main magazine.  Code 0 (no teeth) is for spacebands, which are not carried up to the distributor. Code 1 is skipped (no reason for this is given in the Linotype manual). Codes 2 through 92 are for the 91-channel main magazine, and the codes above that are for the auxiliary magazine, if one is installed on the machine. The widest auxiliary magazine has 34 channels, so its rightmost channel is code 125. Code 126 is unused while code 127 is used for pi matrices (described below).

Pi matrices 

In typesetting, it is sometimes necessary to use characters that are uncommon or obscure enough that it does not make sense to assign them to a magazine channel. These characters are referred to as pi characters or sorts ("pi" in this case refers to an obscure printer's term relating to loose or spilled type). Footnote marks, rarely used fractions, and mathematical symbols are examples of pi characters. In the linotype machine, a pi matrix has all teeth present (code 127, no teeth cut away) so it will not drop from the distributor bar and will not be released into either the main or the auxiliary magazine. Instead, it travels all the way to the end and into the flexible metal tube called the pi chute and is then lined up in the sorts stacker, available for further use.

See also 
 Ottmar Mergenthaler
 Monotype System
 Monotype Corporation
 Lanston Monotype
 Saguache Crescent
 Etaoin shrdlu

Notes

References 

 
 Basil Kahan: Ottmar Mergenthaler – The Man and his Machine; Oak Knoll Press, New Castle (DE), 2000 –

External links 

 Linotype: The Film – In Search of the Eighth Wonder of the World (Doug Wilson, 2012) is a feature-length documentary centered around the Linotype type casting machine.
"Farewell, Etaoin Shrdlu". short film about history of Linotype and transition to modern methods. New York Times, 2016-10-14. 
 The Printing (Holmes Burton Films Inc., 1947) documentary about linotype tech. in printing industry
 Metal Type – "For Those who Remember Hot Metal Typesetting"
 Intertype Book of Instruction is a complete manual on the operation and maintenance of the Intertype linotype machines
 Linotype Machine on Woodsidepress.com
 Linecast typesetting service at linotypesetting.com
 Typesetting: Linotype vocational instruction film: part 1 and part 2.
 1/13/1894;The Linotype a Machine To Supersede Typesetting
 The 1966 Automatically Controlled Elektron (ACE) Linotype, Teletype, Intertype and more
 Linotype machine patents 

Printing
Typography
American inventions
19th-century inventions